Hits! is a compilation album by Boz Scaggs, first released in 1980. It focuses primarily on material released in 1976 and 1980. The album has been certified platinum by the RIAA.

Reception

In a retrospective review by Jason Elias for AllMusic, he criticized the album's lack of comprehensiveness, particularly the omission of "What Can I Say". Elias deemed that the later release My Time: A Boz Scaggs Anthology makes Hits! completely redundant.

Track listing
 "Lowdown" (Boz Scaggs, David Paich) – 4:27
 "You Make It So Hard (to Say No)" (Scaggs) – 3:32
 "Miss Sun" (Paich) – 5:33
 "Lido Shuffle" (Scaggs, Paich) – 3:41
 "We're All Alone" (Scaggs) – 4:11
 "Breakdown Dead Ahead" (Scaggs, David Foster) – 4:01
 "Look What You've Done to Me" (Scaggs, Foster) – 5:17
 "Jojo" (Scaggs, Foster, David Lasley) – 4:06
 "Dinah Flo" (Scaggs) – 3:03
 "You Can Have Me Anytime" (Scaggs, Foster) – 4:56

The Australian release of Hits! replaced Track 9 "Dinah Flo" with "What Can I Say" (B. Scaggs, D. Paich).

Re-release
In 2006 Hits! was re-released with additional tracks and a new cover.

 "What Can I Say" (Scaggs, Paich)
 "Jojo" (Scaggs, Foster, Lasley)
 "Miss Sun" [Long Version] (Paich)
 "Hard Times" (Scaggs)
 "Slow Dancer" (Scaggs, George Daly)
 "Harbor Lights" (Scaggs)
 "Dinah Flo" (Scaggs)
 "Look What You've Done to Me" (Scaggs, Foster)
 "Breakdown Dead Ahead" (Scaggs, Foster)
 "You Make It So Hard (To Say No)" (Scaggs)
 "It's Over" (Scaggs, Paich)
 "We're All Alone" (Scaggs)
 "Heart of Mine" (Bobby Caldwell, Dennis Matkosky, Jason Scheff)
 "Lowdown" (Scaggs, Paich)
 "Lido Shuffle" (Scaggs, Paich)

Personnel
"Lowdown"
 Boz Scaggs – lead vocals
 David Paich – keyboards, strings and horns arrangements
 Fred Tackett – guitar, guitar solo
 Louie Shelton – guitar
 David Hungate – bass
 Jeff Porcaro – drums
 Carolyn Willis – background vocals
 Marty McCall – background vocals
 Jim Gilstrap – background vocals
 Augie Johnson – background vocals

"You Make It So Hard (to Say No)
 Boz Scaggs – lead vocals, guitar
 James Gadson – drums
 James Jamerson – bass guitar
 Joe Sample, Clarence McDonald – keyboards
 David T. Walker, Dennis Coffey, Wah Wah Watson – guitar
 Carolyn Willis, Julia Tillman Wate, Lorna Willard, Myrna Matthew, Pat Henderson - background vocals
 H.B. Barnum - string arrangements, conductor

"Miss Sun"
 Boz Scaggs – lead vocals
 Jeff Porcaro – drums, percussion
 David Paich – keyboards, moog bass, synthesizers
 Steve Lukather – guitar 
 Steve Porcaro – synthesizers
 Lisa Dal Bello – vocals

"Lido Shuffle"
 Boz Scaggs – lead vocals, guitar
 David Paich – keyboards, horns arrangements, synthesizers solo
 Jeff Porcaro – drums
 David Hungate – bass guitar
 Fred Tackett – guitar

"We're All Alone"
 Boz Scaggs – lead vocal
 Jeff Porcaro – drums
 David Hungate – bass guitar
 David Paich – keyboards, strings and horns arrangements

"Breakdown Dead Ahead"
 Rick Marotta – drums
 Boz Scaggs – lead vocals, guitar
 David Foster – keyboards
 Don Grolnick – electric piano
 Lenny Castro – percussion
 David Hungate – bass
 Steve Lukather –  guitar, guitar solo
 Ray Parker Jr. – guitar 
 Paulette Brown, Venetta Fields, Bill Thedford – background vocals

"Look What You've Done To Me"
 David Foster – keyboards, strings and horns arrangements
 Don Felder, Steve Lukather – guitar 
 Mike Porcaro – bass guitar
 Jeff Porcaro – drums
 Glenn Frey, Don Henley, Timothy B. Schmit, background vocals

"JoJo"
 Boz Scaggs – lead vocals, guitar
 David Foster – keyboards, synthesizer, strings arrangements
 Jerry Hey – horns arrangements
 Ray Parker Jr., Steve Lukather – guitar
 John Pierce – bass guitar
 Jeff Porcaro – drums
 Lenny Castro – percussion
 Adrian Tapia – saxophone solo
 David Lasley, Sharon Redd, Charlotte Crossley – background vocals

"Dinah Flo"
 Boz Scaggs – vocals, electric guitar
 Barry Beckett – piano
 Pete Carr – electric guitar
 Charles Chalmers – saxophone, background vocals
 Sandra Chalmers – background vocals
 Roger Hawkins – drums
 Eddie Hinton – acoustic guitar
 David Hood – bass guitar
 Clayton Ivey – organ,  keyboards
 Jimmy Johnson – electric guitar
 Donna Rhodes – background vocals
 Muscle Shoals Horns – horns, horns arrangements

"You Can Have Me Anytime"
 Boz Scaggs – lead vocal
 David Foster – piano, synthesizers
 David Hungate – bass
 Marty Paich – strings arrangements
 Jeff Porcaro – drums
 Carlos Santana – guitar solo

Production
 Boz Scaggs – producer
 Johnny Bristol – producer
 David Foster – producer
 Roy Halee – engineer, producer
 Joe Wissert – producer
 Tom Perry – engineer
 Al Schmitt – engineer
 Bill Schnee – engineer, producer
 Greg Venable – engineer
 Mike Reese – mastering
 Lois Walker – mastering

Charts

Weekly charts

Year-end charts

References

1980 greatest hits albums
Boz Scaggs albums
Columbia Records compilation albums
Legacy Recordings compilation albums